The 2005 Clásica de Almería was the 20th edition of the Clásica de Almería cycle race and was held on 27 February 2005. The race started in El Ejido and finished in Almería. The race was won by Iván Gutiérrez.

General classification

References

2005
2005 in road cycling
2005 in Spanish sport